Mesogammaridae is a family of crustaceans belonging to the order Amphipoda.

Genera:
 Eoniphargus Uéno, 1955
 Indoniphargus Straškraba, 1967
 Mesogammarus Tzvetkova, 1965
 Octopupilla Tomikawa, 2007
 Paramesogammarus Bousfield, 1979
 Potiberaba Fišer, Zagmajster & Ferreira, 2013

References

Amphipoda